Psychédélices (English:Psych-delights) is the third studio album by French recording artist Alizée, released on 23 November 2007 by RCA Records. It was the first album without collaboration with Mylene Farmer and Laurent Boutonnat. It was certified gold by the SNEP in March 2008, denoting shipments in excess of 80,000 copies in France. It was also certified gold in Mexico in August 2008 for shipments of over 50,000 copies in that country. Psychédélices was released on streaming services on 30 August 2021. However, this version was removed from streaming services in early to mid-July 2022, and replaced with a remastered version on 22 July 2022. This version, however, was removed from streaming services at the end of 2022.

Background

The title of the French singer's album was Psychedelices making reference to the plot of all the material. After a four-year hiatus, a time spent out of the media limelight, Alizée returned in December 2007 with a new album, Psychédélices, the first one to be made without the creative supervision of her former mentor, Mylène Farmer. The album, which features 11 tracks, was made available for digital downloads 26 November 2007, with a full release on 3 December 2007 on the RCA label. The album includes collaborations with Bertrand Burgalat, Daniel Darc, Oxmo Puccino, Jérémy Chatelain, Michel-Yves Kochmann, and Jean Fauque.

Promotion

The first single extracted from the album was "Mademoiselle Juliette", officially released on 30 September 2007. It was accidentally released early on the Virgin Megastore website on 23 September 2007, but was taken down later citing an error on the part of Virgin Music, France. The single was later made available in online music stores as well as radio stations, and went on to capture the #13 spot on the legal music downloads charts. To promote the single, Alizée appeared on the French radio station, NRJ, on 27 September 2007. The video for the single was released for broadcast on 19 November 2007, though it was made available on MSN France on 16 November 2007. It was released on both CD and vinyl, on 21 January 2008.

Another track from the album, "Fifty-Sixty", was leaked two months before the album was released. Though the song was not mentioned by name, the leak was confirmed in a press release which revealed the title and release schedule of the album. "Fifty-Sixty" later launched as the second single from the album in February 2008. The lyrics to "Fifty-Sixty" tell, in personal and metaphorical manner, of a young model under the guidance of Andy Warhol, possibly inspired by the real-life story of Edie Sedgwick. The song ends with a reiteration of how she foolishly believed Andy that she was the most beautiful model of all. Three music videos were released for the single – one for the album version of the song and the other two for two remixes. An Alizée website, Psychedeclips.com, was dedicated to the video series, the first of which was released on 5 May 2008.

Coinciding with the new album, a new official website was created, which, despite being announced on 11 September 2007, was kept under wraps until 28 November 2007. The album was also promoted via an official artist profile at MySpace. Advertising and marketing campaigns for the album began 22 November 2007 with ad campaigns on NRJ Radio, TF1-TV, and the web.

Tour
The Psychédélices Tour started in 2008, to promote Alizée's album. The tour was highly focused in Mexico, one of the countries where Alizée has experienced the most success. On 2008, she gave one performance in Russia and five in Mexico. A performance in Paris, France, on Le Grand Rex was cancelled, making this the only tour by Alizée that had no venues in France. She returned to Mexico in 2009 for one concert for San Marcos Fair, where she appeared as an international guest. The follow-up concert was not part of the actual tour and featured only a partial set list.

Singles
"Mademoiselle Juliette" the song was released as the album's lead single 30 September 2007. A music video for the song directed by Julien Rotterdan was released in November of that same year, and proved to be successful in Mexico. It reached position number 1 in MTV Latin America and position number 138 in a countdown of the 150 most important videos of the channel in the past 15 years. It reached position 22 in the chart of France Top 100 Singles and number 13 in the Top Download Singles chart. It also reached the top 45 in Russia and position 77 in Europe. "Fifty-Sixty" even though "Lilly Town" was planned as the second single, "Fifty-Sixty" was released as the album's second and last international single in February, 2008. The song was inspired by the real-life story of Edie Sedgwick. A music video directed by Yanick Saillet was released to promote the single, and other two videos were produced to accompany two remixes of the song. However, "Fifty-Sixty" did not match the success of "Mademoiselle Juliette".

Other promotional singles
"Lilly Town": The song was planned to be released as the third single from the album, but the record label decided to end the promotion of the album. However, the song did get a minimum release in Mexico. It was sent to Mexican radio stations in March 2008. It proved to be successful on Mexican radio stations, entering the chart of the most played songs.
"La Isla Bonita": It was released as a promotional single to promote the World Tour Edition of the album. It was a cover of a Madonna song. The song was released as a promotional single in August 2008. It was her first top ten song on the Mexican national top ten airplay chart.

Critical reception

Psychédélices was generally well received, and the reviews generated talk of Alizée's independent career after three and half years of musical inactivity and after leaving her former mentors Mylène Farmer and Laurent Boutonnat, while being a mother at the same time. It was also noticed that her style had become a little more mature.

Track listing

CD+DVD Tour Edition 
On 25 June 2008, Psychédélices CD+DVD Edition was released including bonus tracks, a DVD and new artwork. The tour edition was certified Gold for shipping 50,000 copies in its first week. The award was given to Alizée during an autograph session (the second of her career) in Mexico City on 26 June 2008.

Credits
Credits adapted from Psychédélices liner notes.

 Alizée – vocals, backing vocals (all tracks)
Bertrand Burgalat – Bass, Percussion, Piano, Organ (Hammond), Fender Rhodes, Realization
Elise Canepa – Assistant
Sylvain Carpentier – Guitar, Percussion, Programming, Clavier, Engineer, Beat Box, Mixing, Realization
Darius Scheider – Guitar
Jeremy Chatelain – Piano, Programming, Clavier, Realization

Maxine Garoute – Percussion, Drums, Juno, Guest Appearance
Sébastien Gerbi – Engineer
David Husser – Mixing
Michel-Yves Kochmann – Melodica
Anne LePape – Strings
Frederic Lo – Guitar, Programming, Clavier, Engineer, Realization
David Maurin – Drums
Pascal Rode – Guitar

Charts and commercial performance

The album was not considered a total commercial success in France, where it has reached 2nd place on the download charts and 16th place on the physical album sale charts. The album was more successful in Mexico, where the stores put the album on sale three days earlier than the actual release date to avoid piracy, and with only three-day sales the album debuted in 44th place on the Mexican Top 100 Albums Chart and 14th place on the international chart. The album peaked at 21st place on the main chart and 3rd on the international chart in early December.

After falling down the Mexican charts, the album made a second appearance on the charts, reaching 15th place on the Top 100 and 1st place on the international albums chart. In 2008, the album ended as the 52nd best selling album of the year in Mexico.

By June 2008 the album sold over 200,000 copies worldwide.

Weekly charts

Certifications

Release history

References

External links
Official website

2007 albums
Alizée albums
RCA Records albums